Rangachari Sridharan is a civil servant in the Indian Administrative Service. In March 2020, he was appointed as first chief of the National Financial Reporting Authority (NFRA).

Sridharan is a 1983 batch (retired) IAS officer of Karnataka cadre. He will hold the post of chairperson, NFRA, for three years or till he attains the age of 65 years.

References

Living people
Year of birth missing (living people)
Place of birth missing (living people)
Indian Administrative Service officers